The Finland women's national American football team is the official American football senior national team of  Finland.

History 
The team competed at the 2013 IFAF Women's World Championship, where they finished third after beating Germany 20–19.

Finland won the 2019 European Championship before Sweden.

References 

Women's national American football teams
American football
American football in Finland